Dream5 was a Japanese co-ed group that was active from 2009 to 2016.

Summary
In March 2009, over 1,500 singers auditioned on the Japanese TV show "Tensai-TVkun-MAX(NHK)" to become members of a new pop band. 13 members reached the final audition, and five were selected to form the group.
On November 4. 2009, they released first single "I don't obey〜Bokura-no-Pride〜"

In March 2016, Momona Tamakawa announced that she would be leaving the group because of self-esteem issues. On December 26, 2016 the group announced they would disband at the end of 2016 and the beginning of 2017.

Members
Kotori Shigemoto
Mikoto Hibi
Akira Takano
Yūno Ōhara
Momona Tamakawa (retired in April 2016)

Discography

Albums
RUN TO THE FUTURE(2010)
DAYS(2011)
Magokoro to you (2013)
 Dream5 5th Anniversary Single Collection(2015)
 COLORS'' (2016)

Singles
"I don't obey～Bokura-no-Pride～(2009)"
"Bokura no Natsu！！(2010)"
"Koi no Dial 6700" (2011)
"Like & Peace！(2011)"
"Kirakira Every day(2012)"
"I★my★me★mine / EZ Do Dance" (2012)
"READY GO!! / Wake Me Up!(2012)"
"Shekimeki！(2012)"
"COME ON！/ Doremifa-sorairo(2013)"
"Hop! Step! Dance↑↑(2013)"
"We are Dreamer(2013)"
"Break Out / Youkai Taisou Daiichi" (2014)
"Don-Don-Dooby-Zoo-Bah!" (2014)
"Yo-kai Exercise No. 2" (2015)

References

External links
 
 
 

2009 establishments in Japan
Avex Trax artists
Musical groups established in 2009
Musical groups disestablished in 2016